is a Japanese politician.

Kushibuchi sailed on the Peace Boat for the first time in 1990, and later joined the associated nongovernmental organization as an executive. In 2009, she contested her first House of Representatives election and won Tokyo's 23rd district for the Democratic Party of Japan. She succeeded incumbent Kōsuke Itō. Kushibuchi lost her 2012 reelection bid to Masanobu Ogura. Following the 2022 resignation of Tarō Yamamoto, Kushibuchi returned to the House of Representatives via proportional representation, this time as a member of Reiwa Shinsengumi.

References

1967 births
Female members of the House of Representatives (Japan)
Members of the House of Representatives from Tokyo
Living people
21st-century Japanese women politicians
21st-century Japanese politicians
Democratic Party of Japan politicians
Non-profit executives